MEC Highway, or Lebuhraya MEC, Federal Route 222, Asian Highway Route AH 142, is a major highway in Pahang, Malaysia. "MEC" stands for the Malaysia Electric Corporation, the first electrical goods company in Malaysia which closed in 2004. The highway is part of the Asian Highway Network of route AH 142.

The Kilometre Zero of the Federal Route 222 starts at Gambang junctions.

At most sections, the Federal Route 222 was built under the JKR R5 road standard, with a speed limit of 90 km/h.

List of interchange/junctions and towns

References

222
1997 establishments in Malaysia
Highways in Malaysia
Roads in Pahang